Sidney Franklin (born Sidney Frumkin; 11 July 1903 – 26 April 1976) was the first American to become a successful matador, the most senior level of bullfighter.

Biography
Sidney Franklin was born in Brooklyn, New York to Orthodox Jewish parents. In 1922, he traveled to Mexico City, where he began a career in bullfighting. He fought bulls in Spain, Portugal, Mexico, Colombia, and Panama.

In Death in the Afternoon, Ernest Hemingway wrote:

Franklin is brave with a cold, serene and intelligent valor but instead of being awkward and ignorant he is one of the most skillful, graceful and slow manipulators of a cape fighting today. His repertoire with the cape is enormous but he does not attempt by a varied repertoire to escape from the performance of the veronica  as the base of his cape work and his veronicas are classical, very emotional, and beautifully timed and executed. You will find no Spaniard who ever saw him fight who will deny his artistry and excellence with the cape.

And later Hemingway adds,

He is a better, more scientific, more intelligent, and more finished matador than all but about six of the full matadors in Spain today and the bullfighters know it and have the utmost respect for him.

Franklin appeared in a few films in the USA and Mexico. Later he presented bullfights on American TV. He wrote an autobiography, Bullfighter from Brooklyn, and was a close friend of the American actor and legend James Dean, who was a big fan of the art of bullfighting.

He died at home in 1976, age 72, of natural causes. He was gay, his sexual identity having been an open secret among those who knew him, but remaining unknown to the public.

Influence
According to A.E. Hotchner, "Lillian Ross's career with The New Yorker was founded on the success of her profile of the bullfighter Sidney Franklin." – Papa Hemingway, A.E. Hotchner, 1955.

Partial filmography
The Kid from Spain (1932)

References

Franklin, Sidney (1952) Bullfighter from Brooklyn. New York: Prentice-Hall, Inc.
Paul, Bart (2009). Double-Edged Sword: The Many Lives of Hemingway's Friend, the American Matador Sidney Franklin. Lincoln: University of Nebraska Press.
"Sidney Franklin: Bullfighter from Flatbush" http://www.jewsinsports.org/Publication.asp?titleID=3&current_page=375
Sidney Franklin Collection.; P-894; American Jewish Historical Society, Boston, MA and New York, NY.
"Yanqui Matador", 

1903 births
1976 deaths
American bullfighters
Jewish American sportspeople
People from Brooklyn
Vaudeville performers
LGBT Jews
American LGBT sportspeople
Gay sportsmen
LGBT bullfighters
20th-century American Jews
20th-century American LGBT people